Latun (Barzov) Waterfall is a freefalling waterfall located in the eastern Alborz mountain range and in Lavandavil, Astara County, within Gilan Province of far northwestern Iran.

Geography
  It is located in the between Hashtpar and the city of Astara on the Caspian Sea.

Gallery

See also

References

Waterfalls of Iran
Alborz (mountain range)
Astara County
Landforms of Gilan Province
Tourist attractions in Gilan Province